is a railway station on the Aizu Railway Aizu Line in the town of Minamiaizu, Minamiaizu District, Fukushima Prefecture, Japan, operated by the Aizu Railway.

Lines

Station layout
Tajimakōkōmae Station has a single side platform serving a single bi-directional track. There is no station building, but only a waiting room on the platform. The station is unattended.

Adjacent stations

History
It was renamed to its present name on July 16, 1987.

Surrounding area
Fukushima Prefectural Tajima High School

See also
 List of railway stations in Japan

External links

 Aizu Railway Station information 

Railway stations in Fukushima Prefecture
Aizu Line
Railway stations in Japan opened in 1951
Minamiaizu, Fukushima